Rachel Annetta Robinson (née Isum; born July 19, 1922) is the widow of professional baseball player Jackie Robinson, as well as an American former professor and registered nurse.

Life and work
Rachel Isum was born in Pasadena, California, and attended Manual Arts High School in Los Angeles, California, and the University of California, Los Angeles (UCLA). At UCLA, she met Robinson in 1941 prior to his leaving UCLA when his baseball eligibility ran out. She graduated from UCLA on June 1, 1945, with a bachelor's degree in nursing. Rachel and Robinson married on February 10, 1946, the year before he broke into the big leagues. They had three children: Jackie, Jr. (1946–1971), Sharon (born 1950), and David (born 1952).

After Jackie Robinson's retirement from baseball following the 1956 season, Rachel Robinson further pursued her nursing career, obtaining a master's degree in psychiatric nursing from New York University. She worked as a researcher and clinician at the Albert Einstein College of Medicine's Department of Social and Community Psychiatry, a position she held for five years.  She then became an Assistant Professor at Yale School of Nursing and later the Director of Nursing at the Connecticut Mental Health Center.

In 1972, she incorporated the Jackie Robinson Development Corporation, a real estate development company specializing in low- to moderate-income housing, and served as president for ten years. In 1973, she founded the Jackie Robinson Foundation, a not-for-profit organization providing educational and leadership opportunities for minority students. The Foundation has provided support for over 1,000 minority students and has maintained a 97% graduation rate among its scholars.

In 1996, she coauthored Jackie Robinson: An Intimate Portrait  with Lee Daniels, published by Abrams Publishing Company.

Awards and honors
In 2007, she was awarded the Commissioner's Historic Achievement Award by Commissioner Bud Selig.

In 2009, she received the UCLA Medal from Chancellor Gene Block for her lifetime achievements. The UCLA Medal is the university's highest honor and was created to "honor those individuals who have made extraordinary and distinguished contributions to their professions, to higher education, to our society, and to the people of UCLA." In addition to earning twelve honorary doctorates, Robinson was awarded the Candace Award for Distinguished Service from the National Coalition of 100 Black Women, the Equitable Life Black Achiever's Award and the Associated Black Charities Black History Makers Award.

Robinson was inducted into the Baseball Reliquary's Shrine of the Eternals in 2014. In 2017, she received the Buck O'Neil Lifetime Achievement Award from the National Baseball Hall of Fame.

Jackie Robinson Foundation 
The Jackie Robinson Foundation is a national, 501(c)(3) non-profit organization, which gives scholarships to minority youths for higher education, as well as preserving the legacy of Baseball Hall of Fame member, Jackie Robinson. It was founded in 1973 by Rachel Robinson. It's located in New York, New York, United States.

Its motto is "JRF has provided college and graduate school scholarships as well as leadership development opportunities for highly motivated students of color with limited financial resources."

Portrayals
Robinson was portrayed by Ruby Dee in the 1950 film The Jackie Robinson Story and by Nicole Beharie in the 2013 film 42.

Personal life
On July 19, 2022, Rachel Robinson turned 100. She currently resides on a  farm in Salem, Connecticut.

See also
 Jackie Robinson Day

References

External links
 Jackie Robinson Foundation Website
 
 Buck O'Neil Lifetime Achievement Award recipient Rachel Robinson at the Baseball Hall of Fame
 "Timeline of events in the lives of Rachel and Jackie Robinson"
 "Advice from the Top: Robinson's widow offers lessons", USA Today Q&A, April 16, 2007
 Rachel Robinson's oral history video excerpts at the National Visionary Leadership Project
 Peter Dreier, "Honoring Rachel Robinson, Baseball Pioneer and Civil Rights Activist". The Huffington Post, July 20, 2014.

1922 births
American centenarians
Living people
Writers from Los Angeles
Jackie Robinson
American nursing administrators
African-American centenarians
African-American educators
African-American nurses
American nurses
American women nurses
Nursing educators
New York University alumni
Women centenarians
Yale University faculty
UCLA School of Nursing alumni
Baseball players' wives and girlfriends